Mammalian Genome is a peer-reviewed journal that publishes research and review articles in the fields of genetics and genomics in mouse, human and related organisms. As of July 2009 its editors-in-chief are Joseph H. Nadeau and Stephen D. M. Brown. Mammalian Genome has been published by Springer since the journal was launched in 1991, and is the official journal of the International Mammalian Genome Society. In 1998 the journal Mouse Genome was merged into Mammalian Genome. Authors are allowed to self-archive, and can pay extra for open access for an article.

References

Genetics journals
Monthly journals